The Taipei Tianmu Baseball Stadium is a baseball stadium located in Tianmu Sport Park in Shilin District, Taipei, Taiwan. It was built in 1999, and mostly hosts baseball games. Originally designed as a community ballpark, Tianmu Stadium is located in a rather high price residential neighborhood of Tianmu, resulting in many sound and light restrictions in regard to the usage of the stadium. Because of this, professional games are only held over the weekends.

Transportation
The stadium is accessible within walking distance east from Mingde Station of Taipei Metro.

See also
 List of stadiums in Taiwan
 Sport in Taiwan

References

Sports venues completed in 1999
Baseball venues in Taiwan
Sports venues in Taipei
1999 establishments in Taiwan